Mayla is a rural locality (a settlement) in Khorinsky District, Republic of Buryatia, Russia. The population was 337 as of 2010. There are 9 streets.

Geography 
Mayla is located 53 km north of Khorinsk (the district's administrative centre) by road. Alan is the nearest rural locality.

References 

Rural localities in Khorinsky District